The List of military equipment includes sub-lists by type and country.

By type 

 List of aircraft
 List of military vehicles
 List of ships
 List of weapons

By country

Historical 
 List of Australian military equipment of World War II
 World War II military equipment of Brazil
 List of military equipment of the Canadian Army during the Second World War
 List of Chinese military equipment in World War II
 List of Croatian military equipment of World War II
 List of Dutch military equipment of World War II
 List of German military equipment of World War II
 List of British military equipment of World War II 
Italian Army equipment in World War II
 List of Japanese military equipment of World War II
 Military equipment of Sweden during World War II
 List of Thailand military equipment of World War II
List of USA army military equipment of World War II
List of Soviet Union military equipment of World War II
List of equipment of the Philippine Commonwealth Army

General 
 List of equipment of the Algerian People's National Army
 List of military equipment of Croatia
 List of infantry weapons and equipment of the Canadian military
 Equipment of the Syrian Army
 List of military equipment used by Syrian opposition forces

By era or conflict 

 List of equipment used in World War II

See also 

 Military technology and equipment
 List of military bases
 List of cancelled military projects